Ahmed Al-Rubei (1949, Al Murqab, Kuwait – 5 March 2008) was a prominent liberal Kuwaiti politician, journalist, and professor. He graduated from Harvard University with a PhD in Islamic philosophy. He was elected as a Member of Parliament in the National Assembly of Kuwait in 1985, 1992, and 1999. He also served as Kuwait's Minister of Education and Higher Education from 1992 to 1996. He was also a professor in Kuwait University's Philosophy department.

He was a regular columnist for several newspapers, including Asharq Alawsat and Al-Qabas. He died on March 5, 2008, after a two-year battle with brain cancer.

References
 Ahmed al-Rubei, prominent Kuwaiti liberal politician, dead at 59 - International Herald Tribune, March 6, 2008
 Prominent Kuwaiti politician dead at 59 - USA Today, March 6, 2008
 In Commemoration of Ahmed al Rabey - Asharq Alawsat, March 7, 2008
 Kuwait Politics Database

1949 births
2008 deaths
Members of the National Assembly (Kuwait)
Harvard University alumni
Academic staff of Kuwait University
Government ministers of Kuwait